How End is a hamlet located in the Central Bedfordshire district of Bedfordshire, England.

The settlement is close to the larger villages of Stewartby and Houghton Conquest. How End forms part of the Houghton Conquest civil parish.

Hamlets in Bedfordshire
Central Bedfordshire District